The women's triple jump at the 2019 World Athletics Championships was held at the Khalifa International Stadium in Doha, Qatar, from 3 to 5 October 2019.

Summary
Just a month before this event, Yulimar Rojas jumped 15.41m for the #2 mark in history.  It was almost half a metre longer than world #2 Shanieka Ricketts.  #6 of all time Caterine Ibargüen was also in this competition and has been in that neighborhood in the past, but hadn't jumped over 15 metres since 2016.  At 35, she had already set the Masters world record twice this season.

As the third jumper in the finals, Rickets put her first effort out at 14.81m.  The next jumper up was Rojas jumping marginally better with a 14.87m.  The next best jumper in the first round was Kimberly Williams with a 14.64m, her personal best.  As her second attempt, Rojas landed  (-0.6) meaning into a slight headwind.  It was the #4 jump in history, with only Françoise Mbango Etone's winning jump from the 2008 Olympics separating it from her own #2.  Game.  Set.  Match.   

Later in the round, Williams duplicated her personal best and held on to third place until the fifth round, when Ibargüen took the bronze away with a 14.73m.  On her third attempt, the crowd was silenced for a moment as Rojas flew beyond the world record, but the jump was ruled a foul as she took off more than half a shoe length beyond the take off board.  Inconsequential to the results, Rojas' fourth attempt of 15.18m equaled the #26 jump in history and was the sixth longest ancillary jump in history.

Records
Before the competition records were as follows:

Schedule
The event schedule, in local time (UTC+3), is as follows:

Results

Qualification
Qualification: Qualifying Performance 14.30 (Q) or at least 12 best performers (q) advanced to the final.

Final
The final was started on 5 October at 20:35.

References

Women's triple jump
Triple jump at the World Athletics Championships